Böhme is a municipality in the Heidekreis district, in Lower Saxony, Germany.

Subdivisions
The four subdivisions in the municipality are:
Böhme
Bierde
Altenwahlingen
Kirchwahlingen

References

Heidekreis